Paul Gamory-Dubourdeau (29 October 1889 – 10 January 1963) was a French collaborator during World War II. A decorated army officer in the French army, Gamory-Dubourdeau volunteered in the Waffen SS, becoming commander of the French SS Volunteer Assault Brigade before transferring to the SS headquarter in Berlin. After the war he was captured and sentenced to life imprisonment.

Biography 
Paul-Marie Gamory-Dubourdeau was born on 29 January 1885 in Ploudalmézeau, Brittany. He started his military career in 1903 after joining the 2nd Foreign Infantry Regiment of the French Foreign Legion.
In 1911, after attending the École militaire d'infanterie de Saint-Maixent, he served with the Camel Corps in Sudan and Tibesti. From 1916 to 1918 he served in France with corps of colonial infantry Senegalese Tirailleurs. Based in Morocco. He retired from the army in 1928 settling in Casablanca. In 1936 he joined the French fascist and anti-semitic political party French Popular Party (PPF).

In 1943 Gamory-Dubourdeau volunteered for the Waffen-SS, becoming commander of the first French SS formation known as the French SS Volunteer Assault Brigade from April to August 1944 after training at the SS-Junkerschul at Bad Tölz in Bavaria. In December 1944 Gamory-Dubourdeau was transferred to the SS headquarter in Berlin to lead the French Department of the SS Main Office. In May 1945 he was captured by American troops and sent to a French prison. In 1947 Gamory-Dubourdeau was sentenced to life imprisonment and dégradation nationale (stripping of rank), Gamory-Dubourdeau died at Sours in 1963.

References

Citations

Sources
 
 
 
 
 
 

1880s births
1963 deaths
French Army officers
Officers of the French Foreign Legion
French military personnel of World War I
French Army personnel of World War II
SS-Sturmbannführer
Recipients of the Croix de Guerre 1914–1918 (France)
Recipients of the Legion of Honour
French Waffen-SS personnel
French prisoners sentenced to life imprisonment
People convicted of treason against Germany
Prisoners sentenced to life imprisonment by France